Anna Roberts (born November 11, 1957) is a Canadian politician who was elected to represent the riding of King—Vaughan in the House of Commons of Canada in the 2021 Canadian federal election.

Personal life
Prior to being elected, Roberts worked over 30 years in the banking industry. She is the daughter of Italian immigrants.

Roberts has spent over 30 years volunteering locally, specifically with organisations like Salvation Army, Toronto Sick Children's Hospitals, etc., and with the King City Lodge (Retirement Home).

Electoral results

References

External links

Living people
Members of the House of Commons of Canada from Ontario
Conservative Party of Canada MPs
Women members of the House of Commons of Canada
21st-century Canadian politicians
21st-century Canadian women politicians
Canadian people of Italian descent
Canadian bankers
1957 births